The Savary 1910 biplane was a French  sports aircraft built in the early 1910s.

Specifications

References

Bibliography

Single-engined tractor aircraft
Aircraft first flown in 1910